is a Japanese light novelist and manga writer. He won the Gold Prize in the 9th Dengeki Novel Prize for Baccano!, which was made into an anime television series in 2007. His series Durarara!! was also made into two anime television series, one airing January 2010 and the second in January 2015.

Works
Narita's works all feature a single thematic style, involving an ensemble cast of characters (each with their own viewpoint chapters) finding their lives intersecting with each other in various ways due to a supernatural entity, and more often than not getting into conflict with each other. Additionally, the first four light novel titles below take place within a shared universe known by fans as the "Naritaverse", featuring fantastical elements within an otherwise normal society.

Baccano!
Baccano! is mostly set within a fictional United States during various time periods, most notably the Prohibition era. It focuses on various people, including alchemists, thieves, thugs, Mafiosi and Camorristi, who are unconnected to one another. After an immortality elixir is recreated in 1930 Manhattan, the characters begin to cross paths, setting off events that spiral further and further out of control. It is illustrated by Katsumi Enami.

Etsusa Bridge
Set on a giant, almost finished bridge between Sadogashima and Niigata. Abandoned by the government, the bridge, and the giant man-made floating island at the center, has become a city of criminals and societal drop-outs. It is illustrated by Suzuhito Yasuda.

Durarara!!
Durarara!! tells the story of a dullahan working as an underworld courier in Ikebukuro, an internet-based anonymous gang called the Dollars, and the chaos that unfolds around the most dangerous people in Ikebukuro. It is illustrated by Suzuhito Yasuda.

Vamp!
Vamp! is a light novel series about vampires and other supernatural creatures that live on an island in Germany called Growerth. It is illustrated by Katsumi Enami.

Hariyama-san
Hariyama-san, the Heart of the World is a series of connected short stories. They are basically strange or supernatural events that are seemingly unrelated, except that every one of them involves the title character, Shinkichi Hariyama, as a minor character in some capacity. The last story in each volume ties all the previous stories together. It is illustrated by Katsumi Enami and Suzuhito Yasuda.

Bleach: Spirits Are Forever With You
Bleach: Spirits Are Forever With You is a light novel based on Tite Kubo's Weekly Shōnen Jump manga Bleach.

Stealth Symphony
A manga which follows the story of the main protagonist Jig Kumonuma, as he goes to the city of Jinbō-chō, a place where creatures of different species live, to remove a curse from his body. It is illustrated by Yōichi Amano.

Fate/strange fake
The Fate/strange fake novel is a spinoff of Fate/stay night. The story is set in the western U.S. during a war that occurs a few years after the conclusion of the Fifth Holy Grail War.

Dead Mount Death Play
Dead Mount Death Play is a manga written by Narita and illustrated by Shinta Fujimoto published in Square Enix's Young Gangan manga magazine since 2017.

References

External links 
 Ryōgo Narita's website
 Ryōgo Narita's official Twitter account

1980 births
21st-century Japanese novelists
Pulp fiction writers
Light novelists
Living people